Girls, Boys and Marsupials is the first album by The Wombats, released in 2006 in Japan only. Many of these songs appear on their debut album A Guide to Love, Loss & Desperation, released the following year. The tracks that did not feature on this album ("Metro Song", "Sunday TV", "Derail & Crash" and "Caravan in Wales") featured as B-sides on single releases of "Kill the Director", "Let's Dance to Joy Division" and "Backfire at the Disco". "Derail & Crash" and "Metro Song" also featured on the iTunes bonus version of A Guide to Love, Loss & Desperation.

Track listing

The Wombats albums
2006 debut albums